A grille or grill (French word from Latin craticula, small grill) is an opening of several slits side-by-side in a wall, metal sheet or another barrier, usually to allow air or water to enter and/or leave and prevent larger objects (such as animals) from going in or out.

A similar definition is "a French term for an enclosure in either iron or bronze."

Register vs. grille
In heating, cooling, ventilation, or a combination thereof, a grille is a perforated cover for an air duct.  Grilles sometimes have louvers which allow the flow of air to be directed.

A register differs from a grille in that a damper is included. However, in practice, the terms "grille", "register", and "return" are often used interchangeably, and care must be taken to determine the meaning of the term used.

Grillwork
Grillwork is decorative grating of metal, wood, stone, or other material used as a screen, divider, barrier, or as a purely decorative element. It may function as a window, either with or without glazing. Grillwork may also refer to grilles, decorative front ends of motor vehicles. Grillwork is sometimes referred to as simply as a grill or as grille, but the latter terms do not convey a decorative quality. These words are all derived from the Old French .
Other terms are used to refer to such decorative work. If the screen is made from iron, the term ironwork is often used. The term in Spanish, reja can also refer to metal fences. If the screen is made from cutouts of wood, the term fretwork is also used.

See also
 Register (air and heating)

References

Architectural elements